Royal Academy of Fine Arts may refer to:

 Royal Academy of Fine Arts (Antwerp), Belgium
 Royal Academy of Fine Arts (Brussels), Belgium
 Royal Academy of Fine Arts (Ghent), Belgium
 Royal Academy of Fine Arts of Liège, Belgium
 Royal Academy of Art (The Hague), Netherlands
 Royal Danish Academy of Fine Arts, Denmark
 Royal Swedish Academy of Arts, Sweden
 Academy of Fine Arts Vienna, Austria
 Academy of Fine Arts Zagreb, Croatia
 Academy of Fine Arts, Munich, Germany
 Accademia di Belle Arti di Roma, Italy
 Dresden Academy of Fine Arts, Germany
 Hungarian University of Fine Arts, Budapest, Hungary, formerly the Hungarian Royal Drawing School
 Prussian Academy of Arts, Germany
 Real Academia de Bellas Artes de San Carlos de Valencia, Valencia, Spain
 Real Academia de Bellas Artes de San Fernando, Madrid, Spain
 Reial Acadèmia Catalana de Belles Arts de Sant Jordi, Barcelona, Spain